Dalków  (1943–1945 German Dalken) is a village in the administrative district of Gmina Czarnocin, within Piotrków County, Łódź Voivodeship, in central Poland.

The village has an approximate population of 620.

References

Villages in Piotrków County